The EastWest Institute (EWI), originally known as the Institute for East-West Security Studies and officially the Institute for EastWest Studies, Inc., was an international not-for-profit, non-partisan think tank focusing on international conflict resolution through a variety of means, including track 2 diplomacy and track 1.5 diplomacy (conducted with the direct involvement of official actors), hosting international conferences, and authoring publications on international security issues. The organization employed networks in political, military, and business establishments in the United States, Europe, and the former Soviet Union.

EWI was founded by John Edwin Mroz and Ira D. Wallach in 1980 as an independent, global organization that promotes peace by creating trusted settings for candid, global discourse among leaders to tackle intractable security and stability challenges. Mroz served as president and CEO of the institute for 34 years until his death, in 2014. EWI has a long-standing track record of convening dialogue and backchannel diplomacy to develop sustainable solutions for major political, economic and security issues. The organization’s initial success was rooted during the Cold War—in fact, EWI hosted the first ever military-to-military dialogue between NATO and Warsaw Pact countries. From its roots as a European-American initiative to bridge the divisions between Europe and Eurasia, Mroz built the institute into one of the world’s pre-eminent non-governmental change-agent institutions.

After four decades of distinctive service, the organization discontinued operations effective January 31, 2021. This decision was taken at the conclusion of a four-month strategic assessment in light of increasing challenges resulting from the global pandemic and related financial challenges facing many nonprofit organizations.

EWI's initiatives focused on a number of different areas including cybersecurity, preventive diplomacy, strategic trust-building (which encompasses Russia-United States relations and China-United States Relations), Economic Security, and Regional Security (focusing on specific areas such as Southwest Asia).

History
The Institute for East-West Security Studies was founded in 1980, when then CEO John Edwin Mroz and Ira D. Wallach set out to study means of addressing areas of political dispute across the Iron Curtain.

In 1984, EWI hosted the first track 2 military-to-military discussions between the NATO and Warsaw Pact countries. These talks, focusing heavily on the establishment of confidence-building measures (CBMs) between the two parties, ultimately resulted in an agreement requiring each side to alert the other of troop movements.

After the fall of the Berlin Wall and the eruption of conflicts in Southeastern Europe, EWI worked to foster economic stability in the region, encouraging cross-border cooperation and training leaders for democratic states. In the 2000s (decade), EWI's operations expanded geographically to China, Southwest Asia and the Middle East, focusing on issues like cybersecurity, economic security, and countering violent extremism.

Since 2008, EWI has partnered with the China Association for International Friendly Contact to organize forums, termed the U.S.-China Sanya Initiative, between retired People's Liberation Army officers and retired U.S. military personnel. The Sanya Initiative is supported by the China-United States Exchange Foundation (CUSEF), a Hong Kong-based nonprofit established by billionaire Tung Chee-hwa.

In May 2009, EWI released its Joint Threat Assessment on Iran, produced by senior U.S. and Russian experts convened by the institute. The assessment, which concluded that the planned system would not protect against an Iranian nuclear threat, helped inform the Obama administration's decision to scrap the ballistic missile defense plan proposed by the Bush administration and replace it with a plan of its own.

In 2016, the institute helped set up an information portal which allows operators of critical infrastructure to share security information internationally.

Initiatives

Strategic trust-building

EWI's Strategic Trust-building Initiative includes its work with Russia, China, and the United States. Through its work with Russia, EWI has sought to "build a sustainable relationship of trust between Russia, its G-8 partners, and the world’s new rising powers." This program was responsible for establishing the 2009 Joint Threat Assessment on Iran. The China program, which was initiated in 2006, seeks to foster China's integration into the international sphere as a productive partner. An example of EWI's China work is the establishment of annual three-party talks between Republican Party, Democratic Party, and Chinese Communist Party leaders.

The Strategic Trust-building Initiative also incorporates EWI's work in Weapons of Mass Destruction issues. The WMD program, which began in 2006, aims to reduce political obstacles to the elimination of the threat of nuclear weapons. EWI organized a series of events and meetings in 2007 and 2008 to address stalled arms discussions in the international community.

Regional security

This program addresses specific regional problems requiring the attention of the international community. Current issues include: security and stability in Afghanistan & Southwest Asia, and Euro-Atlantic security. Regional Security is directly involved with the Parliamentarians Network for Conflict Prevention—a network, founded by EWI in October 2008, that has since grown to include 150 parliamentarians from more than 50 countries. Members of the network work to translate ideas into policy as well as advocate for a greater allocation of resources for preventive action.

In 2010, EWI created the Amu Darya Basin Network, which links experts, researchers and policy makers from Central Asia, Afghanistan and Europe to create a place for key stakeholders to discuss trans-boundary water issues, forge agreements and share knowledge. The Amu Darya Basin Network highlights the need for local ownership and input in the management of shared waters, and for engagement in the region in more concrete ways.

In addition, the regional security program initiated the Abu Dhabi Process, a set of meetings focused on regional cooperation between Afghanistan and Pakistan. The process emphasised that there is no military solution to the conflict in Afghanistan and has seen meeting take place in Abu Dhabi, Kabul and Islamabad among places.

Economic security

EWI's Economic Security Initiative, launched in fall 2011, focuses on increasing resilience and response capabilities in regions threatened by water, food and energy scarcity. This program works with global investors to address dilemmas of growth and sustainability, and also focuses on the security of the digital economy. An example of this work includes the annual Worldwide Security Conference, first held in 2003, which assembles experts from governments, the private sector, NGOs, and academia to explore issues such as countering violent extremism, securing infrastructure, and energy security.

The Worldwide Cybersecurity Initiative is a part of the ESI. It aims to reduce vulnerabilities in governmental and private cybersecurity policies by developing consensus proposals for new agreements and policy reform. The institute's chief method of achieving this goal has been the hosting of the Worldwide Cybersecurity Summit, an annual meeting of governmental and corporate actors in the field, first held in May 2010 at Dallas, Texas, which established policy recommendations for securing international cyber infrastructure.

Publications

References

External links
 

Foreign policy and strategy think tanks
International political organizations
International security
NATO relations
Think tanks established in 1980
International organizations based in the United States